Haplochromis orthostoma is a species of cichlid fish that is endemic to the Lake Kyoga system in Uganda, where only known from Lake Bisina (a medium-sized lake to the east of Lake Kyoga itself) and Lake Nawampassa (a small lake southeast of Lake Kyoga itself and only separated by a thin swamp). Its continued survival in Lake Bisina is questionable as it has not been recorded in recent surveys, but it still survives in Lake Nawampassa. This piscivorous species is peaceful among similar-sized or larger fish, but will rapidly swallow smaller fish with its very large mouth.

References

orthostoma
orthostoma
Endemic freshwater fish of Uganda
Fish described in 1922
Taxa named by Charles Tate Regan
Taxonomy articles created by Polbot